Pedro Francisco Garcia, best known as Tupãzinho (born in Tupã, July 7, 1968 was a Brazilian footballer, nicknamed by fans Talismã da Fiel (Fiel's Talisman).

He was the player who scored the goal that gave the first Brazilian Championship title for Sport Club Corinthians Paulista at 1990.

Honours 

 1990 : Brazilian Championship
 1995 : Copa do Brasil
 1995 : Campeonato Paulista
 1997 : Campeonato Brasileiro Série B

References

1968 births
Living people
Footballers from São Paulo (state)
Brazilian footballers
América Futebol Clube (MG) players
Sport Club Corinthians Paulista players
Fluminense FC players
Esporte Clube São Bento players
Esporte Clube XV de Novembro (Piracicaba) players
Association football midfielders
União Esporte Clube players
People from Tupã, São Paulo